LLL may refer to:

Businesses and organisations 
L3 Technologies, an American defense contractor formerly with the NYSE stock symbol LLL
La Leche League, an organization that promotes breastfeeding

Education 
LL.L (Legum Licentiatus), a degree in civil law at various Canadian universities (especially in Québec)
Lifelong learning
Lambda Lambda Lambda, a co-ed fraternity

Entertainment 
Leisure Suit Larry in the Land of the Lounge Lizards, the first of a series of video games
Love's Labour's Lost, a comedy by William Shakespeare
Landau, Luckman, and Lake, a fictional holding company in Marvel Comics
LLL, the production code for the 1972 Doctor Who serial The Sea Devils
"L. L. L.", a 2015 song by Myth & Roid

Military units 
Loyal Lusitanian Legion, a foreign volunteer corps of the British Army, that fought in the Peninsular War

Religion 
Lutheran Laymen's League, also known as Lutheran Hour Ministries, a Christian outreach ministry 
"Lunatic, Liar, or Lord", a common summary of Lewis's trilemma, a theological argument from C. S. Lewis

Science, technology, computing 
Low-level programming language, such as machine code or assembly
Lenstra–Lenstra–Lovász lattice basis reduction algorithm, a polynomial time lattice reduction algorithm
Lowest Landau level, wave functions in quantum mechanics
Lovász local lemma, a lemma in probability theory 
Lawrence Livermore Laboratory, now known as Lawrence Livermore National Laboratory, a scientific research laboratory in the United States
One of the programming languages used in Ethereum